Chenggong may refer to several places:

Chenggong County, in Kunming, Yunnan, China
Chenggong, Taitung, township in Taitung, Taiwan
Chenggong Station, a railway station in Taichung, Taiwan

See also
Duke Cheng (disambiguation)